The Septuagint version of the Old Testament is a translation of the Septuagint by Sir Lancelot Charles Lee Brenton, originally published by Samuel Bagster & Sons, London, in 1844, in English only.

From the 1851 edition the Apocrypha were included, and by about 1870, an edition with parallel Greek text existed; another one appeared in 1884. In the 20th century it was reprinted by Zondervan among others.

Codex Vaticanus is used as the primary source. Brenton's has been the most widely used translation until the publication of New English Translation of the Septuagint in 2007.

References

External links 
1844 edition, scanned at HathiTrust
1844 edition, vol. I, vol. II, at the Internet Archive
1870 edition, scanned at CCEL
1870 edition, multiple formats at the Internet Archive
1879 edition (with Greek, without Apocrypha) at the Internet Archive
1884 edition, html (American English language updates, 2012)
1884 edition, html (British English language updates, 2012)
HTML and zip
HTML one page
Parallel verse lookup with Brenton

1844 books
19th-century Christian texts
English, Brenton's
Editions of the Septuagint